Czaple  is a village in the administrative district of Gmina Pielgrzymka, within Złotoryja County, Lower Silesian Voivodeship, in south-western Poland.

The village has a population of 348.

References

Czaple